Shin So-yul (born Kim Jung-min on August 5, 1985) is a South Korean actress. Shin began acting in 2006, and appeared in supporting roles in films and television series such as Hello My Love, Jungle Fish 2, and Penny Pinchers. Her breakthrough would come in 2012 with the popular cable dramedy Reply 1997. In 2013, she received acting nominations from the Baeksang Arts Awards and the Grand Bell Awards for her risque role in romantic comedy film My PS Partner, and became one of the hosts of talk show Talk Club Actors. Shin played the leading role in the 2014 daily drama Sweet Secret. In recent years, Shin became recognized for her supporting roles in various television dramas.

Filmography

Film

Television series

Web series

Variety/radio show

Music video

Discography

Awards and nominations

References

External links

 

Mystic Entertainment artists
South Korean television actresses
South Korean film actresses
People from Seoul
1985 births
Living people